The 1962 Little All-America college football team is composed of college football players from small colleges and universities who were selected by the Associated Press (AP) as the best players at each position. For 1962, the AP selected three teams of 11 players each, with no separate defensive platoons. 

Tackle Buck Buchanan was the largest player at 6'6" and 272 pounds; he was the No. 1 pick in the 1963 AFL Draft. Buchanan played 13 seasons for the Kansas City Chiefs and was inducted into the Pro Football Hall of Fame.

Quarterback George Bork of Northern Illinois was the only junior. He was the first college player to pass for 3,000 yards in a season and was later inducted into the College Football Hall of Fame.

End Drew Roberts of Humboldt State and back Joe Iacone of West Chester were the only repeaters on the first team from 1961. Iacone rushed for 1,486 yards in 1962.

First team
 Back - Joe Iacone (senior, 5'9", 190 pounds), West Chester
 Back - George Bork (junior, 6'0", 160 pounds), Northern Illinois
 Back - Richard Kemp (5'11", 194 pounds), Lenoir Rhyne
 Back - Robert "China Doll" Paremore (senior, 5'11", 190 pounds), Florida A&M
 End - Willie Richardson (senior, 6'2", 197 pounds), Jackson State 
 End - Drew Roberts (senior, 6'1", 205 pounds), Humboldt State 
 Tackle - Buck Buchanan (senior, 6'6", 272 pounds), Grambling
 Tackle - Richard Peter (senior, 6'3", 250 pounds), Whittier
 Guard - Ralph Soffredine (senior, 6'0", 195 pounds), Central Michigan
 Guard - Don Hunt (senior, 6'2", 200 pounds), Wittenberg
 Center - Douglas Harvey (senior, 6'2", 218 pounds), Texas A&I

Second team
 Back - Jerry Linton, Panhandle A&M
 Back - Nat Craddock, Parsons
 Back - Jimmy Baker, East Tennessee
 Back - Ron Deveaux, Tufts
 End - Jan Barrett, Fresno State
 End - Howard Hartman, Southern Oregon
 Tackle - Paul Chesmore, Delaware
 Tackle - Richard Koblin, John Carroll
 Guard - Wayne Farmer, Chattanooga
 Guard - Harold Gray, Los Angeles State
 Center - Harold Hays, Southern Mississippi

Third team
 Back - John Murlo, Whitworth
 Back - Dan Boals, State College of Iowa
 Back - Larry Kerstetter, Susquehanna
 Back - Bobby Hidalgo, Adams State 
 End - Buddy Bozeman, Howard
 End - Paul Blazevich, Omaha
 Tackle - Kindley King, Lamar Tech
 Tackle - John Contoulis, Connecticut
 Guard - William Bryant, Emory & Henry
 Guard - Jim Edmiston, Lenoir-Rhyne
 Center - J.R. Williams, Fresno State

See also
 1962 College Football All-America Team

References

Little All-America college football team
Little All-America college football team
Little All-America college football teams